Marcos Daniel was the defender of title, but he chose to not participate this year.
Carlos Salamanca won in the final 6–1, 7–6(5), against Riccardo Ghedin.

Seeds

Draw

Final four

Top half

Bottom half

References
 Main Draw
 Qualifying Draw

Copa Petrobras Bogota - Singles
Copa Petrobras Bogotá